"Here Comes My Baby" is a song written by British singer-songwriter Cat Stevens. It is well known for being an international hit for the Tremeloes in 1967.

Original version
In 1966, Stevens was discovered by Mike Hurst, formerly of the Springfields, who after their split in 1963, decided to become a record producer. Whilst working for American producer Jim Economides, Hurst was introduced to Stevens who was trying to find a record label who would sign him. He played "Here Comes My Baby", which Hurst thought it was great and took it to Economides. However Economides disliked it, so Stevens wasn't signed. The company eventually went bust and some time later, Stevens went to Hurst's house asking if he was still interested after being rejected by every record label in London. Stevens played him a new song, "I Love My Dog", which Hurst thought was "so unusual and really weird" and agreed to record it, with the song eventually being released as Stevens' debut single and to launch Decca Records' flagship label Deram. Meanwhile, "Here Comes My Baby" was shelved after "I Love My Dog" was seen as the stronger song to release as a single, and it was later included on Stevens' debut album Matthew and Son, released in March 1967.

Stevens' version notably features in the 1998 Wes Anderson film Rushmore along with "The Wind"; it was the first film he granted permission to use his songs after his conversion to Islam in the late 1970s.

The Tremeloes version

After Stevens shelved "Here Comes My Baby", it was recorded by beat group the Tremeloes. Their version was released several months prior to Stevens' album release, with it being released as a single in January 1967. It became the group's first top-ten hit since the departure of lead singer Brian Poole the year before, and their first top-twenty hit in the US.

The Tremeloes' version is slightly different, lyrically, from the original, with the beginning lyrics altered and the final verse left out. Stevens' lyrics begin "In the midnight moonlight I'll / Be walking a long and lonely mile", whereas in the Tremeloes' version, this has been changed to "In the midnight, moonlight hour / he's walking along that lonely, lonely mile". Most cover versions of the song sing this altered version. The group's version is also more upbeat that the original, with Stevens calling it "a complete Xmas-party take on an originally sad song". However, the success of the Tremeloes' version helped establish Stevens as a songwriter, who had his own top-ten hit with "Matthew and Son" in early 1967, and another of his songs, "The First Cut Is the Deepest", would become a hit for P. P. Arnold later in 1967.

Charts

Weekly charts

Year-end charts

Other cover versions and appearances
 In late 1999, American country music band the Mavericks released a cover of the song as a single in Europe. It peaked at number 82 on the UK Singles Chart and number 77 on the Dutch Single Top 100. It also peaked at number 42 on the US Billboard Hot Country Singles & Tracks chart and number 40 on the Canadian RPM Country chart.
 In 2010, a group of YouTubers under the name Sons of Admirals released a cover of the song as a single, which peaked at number 61 on the UK Singles Chart.

References

External links
 
 

1967 songs
1967 singles
Cat Stevens songs
The Mavericks songs
Songs written by Cat Stevens
The Tremeloes songs
CBS Records singles
Song recordings produced by Mike Hurst (producer)
Song recordings produced by Mike Smith (British record producer)